The New York Gothams were an American basketball team based in New York, New York, that was a member of the American Basketball League.

The team was previously known as the Westchester Indians. The team moved to New York during the 1944/45 season and became known as the New York Gothams. After the 1945/46 season, the team became known as the Brooklyn Gothams.

Year-by-year

Basketball teams in New York City
Defunct basketball teams in the United States